Billy McGinty (born 6 December 1964) is a Scottish former professional rugby league footballer who played in the 1990s, and the early 2000s. He played in the forwards for Wigan during the period in the 1990s when they dominated the sport, and later for Workington Town.

Background
McGinty was born in Glasgow, Scotland.

Playing career

Challenge Cup Final appearances
Billy McGinty was an interchange/substitute in Warrington's 14–36 defeat by Wigan in the 1989–90 Challenge Cup Final during the 1989–90 season at Wembley Stadium, London on Saturday 28 April 1990, in front of a crowd of 77,729.

Billy McGinty played right- and was man of the match in Warrington's 12–2 victory over Bradford Northern in the 1990–91 Regal Trophy Final during the 1990–91 season at Headingley, Leeds on Saturday 12 January 1991.

He was selected to go on the 1992 Great Britain Lions tour of Australia and New Zealand.

McGinty played right- in Wigan's 5–4 victory over St. Helens in the 1992–93 Lancashire Cup Final during the 1992–93 season at Knowsley Road, St. Helens on Sunday 18 October 1992.

McGinty played right- in Wigan's 15–8 victory over Bradford Northern in the 1992–93 Regal Trophy Final during the 1992–93 season at Elland Road, Leeds on Saturday 23 January 1993.

After the 1993–94 Rugby Football League season McGinty travelled with defending champions Wigan to Brisbane for the 1994 World Club Challenge. The match was his last for Wigan, as he had already agreed to join Workington Town for a fee of £15,000.

Coaching career

Rugby league
In 1998, McGinty was in charge of Scotland before being replaced by Shaun McRae a year later. He became head coach again after McRae stepped down in 2001.

Rugby union
In 2011 McGinty was appointed defence coach of Edinburgh Rugby under head coach Michael Bradley.

School coaching
In 2013, McGinty joined Royal Grammar School Worcester's rugby coaching set-up.

References

External links
!Great Britain Statistics at englandrl.co.uk (statistics currently missing due to not having appeared for both Great Britain, and England)
Profile at wigan-warriors.com

1964 births
Living people
Great Britain national rugby league team players
Rugby league players from Glasgow
Rugby league second-rows
Scotland national rugby league team coaches
Scottish rugby league coaches
Scottish rugby league players
Warrington Wolves players
Wigan Warriors players
Workington Town coaches
Workington Town players